Deyvillers is a commune in the Vosges department in Grand Est in northeastern France.

See also
Communes of the Vosges department
Fort des Adelphes

References

External links

 Site of Deyvillers

Communes of Vosges (department)